Jeffrey Hewitt (born 1953) is an American politician who served on the Riverside County Board of Supervisors as a member of the Libertarian Party from 2019 to 2023, and as its chair from 2022 to 2023. Prior to his tenure on the board he was active in local politics in Calimesa.

Hewitt was elected to the Calimesa city council in the 2010 election and reelected in the 2014 election before being selected by the city council to become mayor in 2015. He unsuccessfully ran for a seat in the California State Senate and California State Assembly in the 2014 and 2016 elections. Hewitt was elected to the board of supervisors despite being outspent and was labeled as the most powerful elected Libertarian in the United States by the Los Angeles Times. He ran in the 2021 California gubernatorial recall election with the support of the Libertarian Party of California.

Calimesa City Council (2010–2018)

Hewitt was elected to the Calimesa City Council on November 2, 2010, and sworn in on December 7. He was appointed to a second four-year term by the Council in 2014. The council unanimously elected Hewitt Mayor on December 11, 2015, succeeding Joyce McIntire.

In 2018, Hewitt limited Calimesa's contract with the California Department of Forestry and Fire Protection (Cal Fire) to circumvent the state's union requirements. In its place, Calimesa established its own fire department that was free to offer 401(k) retirement plans to its employees in lieu of the pensions required by the Cal Fire union, which had accounted for a large portion of the city's budget. The change also allowed Calimesa to reduce its staffing levels on fire trucks. Hewitt argued that the staffing levels mandated by Riverside County cities with Cal Fire contracts were unnecessarily high, and claims cost cuts made possible by the switch to a city-run fire department saved Calimesa from bankruptcy.

Hewitt resigned from the council on December 20, 2018, after being elected to the Riverside County Board of Supervisors in November. He was succeeded by Bill Davis.

Riverside County Supervisor (2019–2023) 

In an upset victory, Hewitt was elected to the Riverside County Board of Supervisors from District 5 in 2018 against former Republican Assemblyman Russ Bogh, despite Bogh raising twice as much money as Hewitt. Hewitt was sworn into office as a supervisor on January 8, 2019, by Libertarian National Committee Chair Nicholas Sarwark, succeeding retiring supervisor Marion Ashley. In 2018, the Los Angeles Times named Hewitt as the most powerful Libertarian ever elected in the United States, though according to Reason he has since been surpassed by Wyoming State Representative Marshall Burt.

Amid the California government response to the COVID-19 pandemic, Hewitt pushed Riverside County to reopen its businesses more quickly than the rest of California. In September 2020, Hewitt introduced legislation to establish restrictions specific to Riverside County, which would've been looser than those set by the state. The legislation would've allowed some indoor services that had been ordered closed to reopen with capacity limits, including restaurants, gyms, hair salons, places of worship, movie theaters, libraries, and retailers. Hewitt's proposal would have reopened the County fully by November 3, with large events being permitted starting on October 13. Due to a threat by Governor Gavin Newsom to cut state funding to counties that did not follow his guidelines for reopening, Hewitt's plan had the potential to cost Riverside County between $28 million and $656 million in state funding. Hewitt argued that the additional tax revenue gained from reopening the County would offset any loss of state funds. On September 22, the Board of Supervisors voted 3–2 to advance Hewitt's proposal, but delayed its implementation to October. On October 6, the Board voted 4–1 to enact a modified version of Hewitt's plan, with Hewitt as the sole opposing vote. Hewitt says he voted against the final version because the specific deadlines in his original proposal had been removed, and language had been added directing the County to cooperate with the state on reopening guidelines.

In November 2020, a female county employee filed a lawsuit against the county which accused Hewitt of sexual harassment back in May 2020. Riverside County settled the lawsuit in connection with the allegation for $50,000 in April 2021. Later that month, another female county employee filed suit against the county, and accused Hewitt and his chief of staff of making "disparaging and vulgar comments" back in October 2020.

On January 12, 2021, Hewitt was elected by the board to serve as its vice chair for the year. He succeeded Karen Spiegel, who was elected Chair. On January 12, 2022, Hewitt was elected by the board to serve as its chair for the year, with Kevin Jeffries elected Vice Chair. In an unusual move, supervisors Chuck Washington and V. Manuel Perez, both Democrats, abstained from voting on the 2022 appointments. Such votes have been unanimous for at least the last two decades, with the positions rotated annually by district. Washington has also endorsed Hewitt's 2022 re-election challenger, Democratic mayor Yxstian Gutierrez of Moreno Valley, potentially the first such endorsement by a sitting supervisor against a colleague. Hewitt and Gutierrez advanced from the top-two primary on June 7, 2022. Hewitt lost re-election to Gutierrez in the general election.

Other political activities 

Hewitt sought election to the California State Senate in 2014 and the California State Assembly in 2016. 

On April 2, 2016, Hewitt was elected the Region 4 representative to the Libertarian National Committee, succeeding Daniel Wiener. He was re-elected in 2018 and 2020. Hewitt announced his candidacy in the 2021 California gubernatorial recall election in an op-ed in the Orange County Register on May 2, 2021. The 50% threshold to recall incumbent Democrat Gavin Newsom was not reached. Hewitt received 0.7% of the replacement candidate vote.

Electoral history

Personal life 
Hewitt was born in 1953 in Redlands, California. He is married to his third wife Wendy, who is the secretary of the Riverside County Libertarian Party. She has served on the Calimesa City Council since 2020. Hewitt has six children.

References

External links 

Gubernatorial campaign website (archived)

Living people
1953 births
21st-century American politicians
California city council members
California Libertarians
County supervisors in California
Government in Riverside County, California
Libertarian Party (United States) officeholders
Members of the Libertarian National Committee
People from Calimesa, California
Candidates in the 2021 United States elections
Candidates in the 2014 United States elections
Candidates in the 2016 United States elections
Chairpersons of organizations
Candidates in the 2022 United States elections